is a male former international table tennis player from Japan.

Table tennis career
From 1955 to 1957 he won eight medals in singles, doubles, and team events in the World Table Tennis Championships.

The eight World Championship medals included four gold medals; one in the doubles at the 1956 World Table Tennis Championships with Ichiro Ogimura and three in the team event.

See also
 List of table tennis players
 List of World Table Tennis Championships medalists

References

Japanese male table tennis players